Mian Ghulam Sarwar Khan (born 13 October 1955) is a Pakistani politician who is the current Federal Minister for Aviation, in office since 24 May 2019. Prior to this position, he was appointed as Federal Minister for Petroleum on 20 August 2018, but he was shifted to the Aviation Ministry. He had been a member of the National Assembly of Pakistan, from August 2018 till January 2023. Previously, he was a member of the National Assembly from 2002 to 2007 and again from June 2013 to May 2018. He remained a member of the Provincial Assembly of the Punjab from 1985 to 1996.

Early life and education
According to the Dawn, Khan was born on 13 October 1955 in Taxila, Punjab, while according to PILDAT he was born on 13 October 1954.

He received a Bachelor of Arts degree from the University of the Punjab. He is an agriculturist by profession.

Fake degree case and Acquittal
In 2002, the authenticity of his diploma degree from the Punjab Board of Technical Education was challenged. In 2007, a petition was filed in the Supreme Court of Pakistan challenging the authenticity of diploma which Khan had received from the Government College University (Faisalabad).

In July 2013, the Supreme Court suspended the National Assembly's membership of Khan for possessing counterfeit degree. According to a report submitted by the Higher Education Commission, both his graduation degree and his diploma in engineering were found fake.

However, on March 1, 2019, the Anti-Corruption Establishment(ACE) stated that the diploma has been found to be genuine. Following this, in April 2019, the Minister was acquitted in this case.

Political career
Khan was elected to the Provincial Assembly of the Punjab from Constituency PP-5 (Rawalpindi-V) in the 1985 Pakistani general election.

He was re-elected to the Provincial Assembly of the Punjab as a candidate of Pakistan Peoples Party (PPP) from Constituency PP-5 (Rawalpindi-V) in the 1988 general election. He received 43,343 votes and defeated Muhammad Kamal, a candidate of Islami Jamhoori Ittehad (IJI).

Khan ran for the seat of the National Assembly of Pakistan as a candidate of People's Democratic Alliance (PDA) from Constituency NA-40 (Rawalpindi-V) in the 1990 Pakistani general election, but was unsuccessful. He received 63,021 votes and lost the seat to Nisar Ali Khan. In the same election, he was re-elected to the Provincial Assembly of the Punjab as a candidate of PDA from Constituency PP-5 (Rawalpindi-V). He received 36,469 votes and defeated Muhammad Kamal, a candidate of IJI.

He ran for the seat of the National Assembly as a candidate of the Pakistan Peoples Party (PPP) from Constituency NA-40 (Rawalpindi-V) in the 1993 Pakistani general election, but was unsuccessful. He received 64,800 votes and lost the seat to Nisar Ali Khan. In the same election, he was re-elected to the Provincial Assembly of the Punjab as a candidate of the PPP from Constituency PP-5 (Rawalpindi-V). He received 40,132 votes and defeated Dildar Khan, a candidate of Pakistan Muslim League (N) (PML-N). Following the election, he was inducted into the provincial Punjab cabinet and was appointed Provincial Minister of Punjab for Zakat and Ushr with the additional ministerial portfolios of Mineral Development, and Fisheries. He also served as the provincial minister of Punjab for health from 1994 to 1996.

He ran for the seat of the Provincial Assembly of the Punjab as a candidate of PPP from Constituency PP-5 (Rawalpindi-V) in 1997 Pakistani general election, but was unsuccessful. He received 26,372 votes and lost the seat to Malik Umar Farooq.

He was elected to the National Assembly as an independent candidate from Constituency NA-53 (Rawalpindi-IV) in the 2002 Pakistani general election. He received 66,900 votes and defeated Nisar Ali Khan. In the same election, he was re-elected to the Provincial Assembly of the Punjab as an independent candidate from Constituency PP-8 (Rawalpindi-VIII). He received 21,961 votes and defeated Muhammad Waqas, a candidate of Muttahida Majlis-e-Amal (MMA). He vacated his provincial seat and retained the National Assembly seat.

In 2004, he was inducted into the federal cabinet of Prime Minister Shaukat Aziz and was appointed as Federal Minister for Labour and Manpower.

He ran for the seat of the National Assembly as a candidate of Pakistan Muslim League (Q) (PML-Q) from Constituency NA-53 (Rawalpindi-IV) in the 2008 Pakistani general election, but was unsuccessful. He received 49,068 votes and lost the seat to Nisar Ali Khan.

He was re-elected to the National Assembly as a candidate of Pakistan Tehreek-e-Insaf (PTI) from Constituency NA-53 (Rawalpindi-IV) in the 2013 Pakistani general election. He received 110,593 votes and defeated Nisar Ali Khan.

He was re-elected to the National Assembly as a candidate of PTI from Constituency NA-59 (Rawalpindi-III) and from Constituency NA-63 (Rawalpindi-VII) in 2018 Pakistani general election. Following his election, he decided to retain his National Assembly seat NA-59 (Rawalpindi-III) and abandon the NA-63 (Rawalpindi-VII).

On 18 August, Imran Khan formally announced his federal cabinet structure and Khan was named as Minister for Petroleum. On 20 August 2018, he was sworn in as Federal Minister for Petroleum in the federal cabinet of Prime Minister Imran Khan.

On 18 April 2018 he resigned as Minister for Petroleum on Imran Khan's orders after a major cabinet reshuffle. There were rumors that he would leave PTI but he denied the rumors, later he was appointed the  Federal Minister for Aviation. On 10 April 2022 after the success of No-confidence motion against Imran Khan the Cabinet dissolved. As well he is no more the  Federal Minister for Aviation.

References

Living people
1955 births
Punjabi people
Punjab MPAs 1985–1988
Punjab MPAs 1988–1990
Punjab MPAs 1990–1993
Punjab MPAs 1993–1996
Pakistani MNAs 2002–2007
Pakistani MNAs 2013–2018
Pakistani MNAs 2018–2023
Pakistan People's Party MPAs (Punjab)
Pakistan Muslim League (Q) MNAs
Pakistan Tehreek-e-Insaf MNAs
Politicians from Rawalpindi
University of the Punjab alumni